Saudi Arabia has historically exerted a strong influence on Afghanistan and was one of the major providers of funds to the Afghan mujahideen who were fighting against the Soviet invaders. Saudi Arabia was also the second of only three countries to recognize the first Taliban government, extending official recognition on 26 May 1997, one day after Pakistan and shortly before the United Arab Emirates. After the 2001 invasion of Afghanistan, Saudi Arabia was one of the major helpers in the Afghan reconstruction. For example, the main highway project was funded mainly by the United States and Saudi Arabia. The Grand Mosque of Kabul in Afghanistan was also financed by Saudi Arabia.

The Saudis started perceiving a growing Iranian encroachment in Afghanistan . They saw the Iranian Revolutionary Guards supporting Shias, but also one of several Afghan branches of the Muslim Brotherhood, Jamaat-e-Islami, and trying to coopt Taliban leaders and groups, and decided to become more active to counter that.

In August 2021, Saudi Arabia evacuated all of its diplomats from its embassy in Kabul after the Taliban movement overtook the country in a swift sweep. Although Saudi Arabia does not recognize the re-established Islamic Emirate of Afghanistan, the Saudi embassy re-opened on 30 November 2021 to provide consular services to Afghan citizens. On February 5, 2023, the Saudi Arabian embassy in Kabul was evacuated following reports that explosive laden vehicles managing to infiltrate Kabul's Green Zone, where the embassy is located. It was also revealed that the terrorist group ISIL had intended to attack the Saudi Arabian embassy during this incident.https://www.khaama.com/turkey-uae-to-reduce-missions-in-afghanistan-over-security-concerns/|title=Turkey, UAE to Reduce Missions in Afghanistan Over ‘Security Concerns’|

Embassies and consulates
 Afghanistan has an embassy in Riyadh and a consulate-general in Jeddah.
 Saudi Arabia has an embassy in Kabul.

References

 
Saudi Arabia
Bilateral relations of Saudi Arabia